The Canon Challenge was a golf tournament held in Australia between 1993 and 2001. Prize money was A$250,000 in 1993, A$300,000 in 1994 and $350,000 in 1995.

In 2001 Paul Gow set an Australasian tour record with a first-round score of 60.

Winners

References

Former PGA Tour of Australasia events
Golf tournaments in Australia
Recurring sporting events established in 1993
Recurring sporting events disestablished in 2001
1993 establishments in Australia
2001 disestablishments in Australia